Stasys Malkevičius (born March 17, 1928) is a Lithuanian politician. In 1990 he was among those who signed the Act of the Re-Establishment of the State of Lithuania.

See also
Politics of Lithuania

External links
 Biography 

1928 births
Living people
Place of birth missing (living people)
Members of the Seimas
Kaunas University of Technology alumni